Piz Vatgira is a mountain of the Lepontine Alps and part of the extended Saint-Gotthard Massif, located south of Sedrun in the canton of Graubünden. The mountain lies between the valleys of Nalps and Medel, about halfway between Lai da Nalps and Lai da Sontga Maria. On its east side is a small glacier ending in the lake named Lai Verd (2,702 m).

Piz Vatgira, or more precisely a lower 2,981 metre-high summit 350 metres south of the main summit, lies exactly above the Gotthard Base Tunnel, at its deepest point. Piz Vatgira is the highest of the three main peaks above the base tunnel, the other two being the Chrüzlistock and Pizzo dell'Uomo.

References

External links
 
 Piz Vatgira on Hikr

Mountains of the Alps
Mountains of Graubünden
Mountains of Switzerland
Tujetsch
Medel (Lucmagn)